HHL could refer to:

 Hafthohlladung, a German anti-tank mine of World War II
 Handelshochschule Leipzig, now the HHL Leipzig Graduate School of Management
 Haverhill (Amtrak station), in Massachusetts, United States
 Harrow-Hassidim-Lloyd algorithm, a quantum algorithm for linear systems of equations
 Heath High Level railway station, in Wales
 Herefordshire Housing, a British social housing trust
 Hecht-Hill-Lancaster Productions
 Higher Hockey League, a Eurasian ice hockey league
 Highway Hockey League, a Canadian ice hockey league